Alpha 0.7 – Der Feind in dir (German: Alpha 0.7 - The Enemy Within You) is a German transmedia science fiction series which first aired on 14 November 2010 on SWR TV. It is set in Stuttgart in 2017 where surveillance is omnipresent. It stars Victoria Mayer, Anna Maria Mühe, Arne Lenk, Tobias Schenke, Oliver Stritzel, Thomas Huber and Rolf Kanies.

See also
List of German television series

External links
 

German science fiction television series
2010 German television series debuts
2010 German television series endings
German-language television shows
Das Erste original programming